PROZ may refer to:

Protein Z, a protein
ProZ.com, an online translators' community